"I'm Not Getting Enough" is a song by Yoko Ono, originally released in 2001 on the album Blueprint for a Sunrise. In 2009, the song was remixed and released as digital green releases (no materials used or abused) by Mind Train and Twisted Records on iTunes and the Twisted Records online store.

Critical reception
Bertrand Joseph-Pare, in his review of the "I'm Not Getting Enough" remixes for About.com, commented, "All things considered, this package contains quite a few nice and interesting mixes. However, it isn't anywhere near as original and groundbreaking as any of ONO's previous efforts."

Track listing
Digital download
 "I'm Not Getting Enough" (Dave Audé Club Mix) – 7:08
 "I'm Not Getting Enough" (Dave Audé Dub) – 6:52
 "I'm Not Getting Enough" (Eddie Amador Club Mix) – 8:50
 "I'm Not Getting Enough" (Eddie Amador Dub) – 9:04
 "I'm Not Getting Enough" (Eddie Amador's Space Transmission Vocal Mix) – 8:35
 "I'm Not Getting Enough" (Eddie Amador's Space Transmission Dub) – 8:56
 "I'm Not Getting Enough" (Craig C & Niques Tribal Vocal Mix) - 8:09
 "I'm Not Getting Enough" (Craig C & Niques Tribal Dub) – 7:02
 "I'm Not Getting Enough" (Zoned Out Mix) – 6:43
 "I'm Not Getting Enough" (Morgan Page Vocal Mix) – 7:37
 "I'm Not Getting Enough" (Morgan Page Dub) – 7:37
 "I'm Not Getting Enough" (Double B Club Mix) – 5:53

Charts

Year-end charts

References 

Yoko Ono songs
2001 songs
2009 singles
Songs written by Yoko Ono
Song recordings produced by Yoko Ono